Western Arms (commonly shortened to "WA") is an airsoft gun manufacturer. They primarily manufacture 1911 and 2011 variants, though they do make several Beretta 92 types and have made other types of pistols.  Recently, they have added three types of GBB M4 carbine rifles to their lineup of gas powered replicas.  Currently, they only produce gas powered blowback replicas, though they have made gas-electric hybrids in the past.

Western Arms' guns generally cost more than other Japanese airsoft manufacturers' GBBs, such as Tokyo Marui.  However, in an effort to attract more buyers, they have released a series of MagnaTech pistols, which are priced less than their standard lineup but with slightly reduced quality.  Despite the name, the MagnaTech series uses the S.C.W. 3 system.

Western Arms Airsoft Gas Blowback List

SCW Version III
Series 70 SCW HOAG National Match DX 6inch
Series 70 Bob Chow Special Version II(HW) 
Series 70 Bob Chow Special with Compensator (HW) 
Bob Chow Special II (HW)
Colt 1911 Gunsite HW (Black) 
Colt 1911 Gunsite HW (Silver) 
SW1911PD Gunsite HW (Silver) 
SW1911PD Gunsite HW (Black) 
Strayer-Voigt Infinity 5.0 Limited HW (Silver) 
Strayer-Voigt Infinity 5.0 Limited HW (Black) 
Strayer-Voigt Infinity 4.3 Limited HW (Silver) 
Strayer-Voigt Infinity 4.3 Limited HW (Black) 
Beretta M8045 Cougar F HW (Silver) 
Night Hawk Custom Vickers Tactical
Beretta M8045 Cougar F HW (Black) 
Strayer-Voigt Infinity Expert All Black HW Slide (Black) 
Strayer-Voigt Infinity Expert All Silver HW Slide (Silver) 
Strayer-Voigt Infinity Classic All Black HW Slide (Black)
Strayer-Voigt Infinity Classic Hybrid Silver HW Slide (Silver)[Discontinued] 
Warrior OD HW 
Desert Warrior HW 
Warrior HW 
Stainless TLE II (Silver) 
LAPD SWAT Custom II 
Para Ordnance H.R.T. (Matte Black) 
Para Ordnance H.R.T. (Parkerized) 
Colt Government Mark IV Series 80 (CQB) 
Remix Detective Special (Two-Tone) 
Colt Government Wilson Combat Super Grade 
2006 Remix Gilded V12 
Colt Government Mark IV Series 80 Officer 
Colt Bob Chow Special (Limited Edition)
M1911A1 Commercial Military 
Colt Government Mark IV Series 80
SIGARMS GSR (2 Tone) 
SIGARMS GSR (Black) 
SW1911 SC 
SW1911 PD 
Colt Government M1911A1 Military 
Colt Government Mark IV Series 70

SCW Version II
LAPD SWAT Custom II [Discontinued]
Wild Heart (Limited Edition)  [Discontinued]
S&W M4013 TSW HW (Black)
S&W M4013 TSW HW (Silver) 
Para-Ordnance P14-45 Limited
Smith&Wesson SW1911 (Silver) 
V10 Ultra Compact (Limited Edition) 
Wilson Combat SDS HW -(Black)
SW1911(HW) 
Colt Government MarkIV Series 80 
Combat FBI Trial Pistol [Discontinued]
TLE / RL II (Black / Silver) 
TLE / RL II Silver 
TLE / RL II Black 
Strayer-Voigt Infinity Expert pistol 4.3 inch 
Strayer-Voigt Infinity Expert pistol 5 inch  [Discontinued]
Strayer-Voigt Infinity Expert Pistol 6 inch  [Discontinued]
GOV'T CQB Hi-Spec (Two Tone HW) 
Wild Hawk - Black (HW, Limited Edition) [Discontinued]
Para-Ordnance H.R.T. Special
Mark IV Series 70

SCW Version I
SIGARMS GSR Revolution HW (Silver) 
SIGARMS GSR Revolution HW (Black) 
Gold Match HW (Silver) 
Wilson Super Grade 5 inch Deluxe HW
2006 Remix Detective Special (Silver) 
Mil-spec 1911-A1 CAL.45 (Silver) 
Railed Shorty .45 (Silver) 
Railed Shorty .45 (Black) 
Stainless TLE II HW Silver 
MARSOC Marine Special Operations Command 
M8045 Cougar F (HW) 
MEU 1911A1 (HW) 
Auto 10mm Delta Elite (Silver) [Discontinued]
M1911A1 U.S.Army
Combat Commander MarkIV series 80 Premium Edition 
U.S. M1911A1 Military
Colt - Bob Chow Special (Limited Edition) 
Colt MK IV Series 90 Defender (Limited Edition)
M84FS
M84FS Silencer Model 
M84FS Standard
M84FS SpyPack
M1934
M1934 Silver Frame 
M1934 
M1934 Mil-Spec Model 
M1934 Silencer Model Limited Edition (HW) 
M1934 Strike Witches Francesca Lucchini Edition
M92FS
M92FS Competition Deluxe 
M92FS Competition Standard 
M92FS Elite II (Two Tone)
M1911s
HI-Capacity.45 CQB Special
Mag Tech Colt Gov. M1911A1 with Silencer
Mag Tech Colt Gov. M1911A1 (Parkerized) 
Commander Light Weight ( 2003 Version ) 
Wilson Combat Super Grade II
SMGs
Mac11
Mini Uzi
Jati-Matic
Berettas
M9A1 Perfect Version HW (Black) 
M9A1 Desert HW 
M9A1 OD HW 
M92FS/DX Ivory Polymer Grip 
M92FS/DX Black Pearl Grip [Discontinued]
M92FS/DX White Pearl Grip 
U.S. 9mm M9 Mil-Spec (HW) 
U.S. 9mm M9 (Black HW)
M92FS Elite IA (Silver)
M92FS Elite IA 
M92FS Premium Edition Perfect (Black)
M92FS Original Perfect 
M92FS Centurion
M92FS INOX Nickel Plated
M8045 Cougar F (Two Tone)
M92FS New Carbon HW (Black)

Magna Series
Infinity Limited 6in 
Infinity Limited 5in
Xcelerator Compact
Xcelerator Fluted 5in
Xcelerator 5in 
Xcelerator Hybrid 6in
Xcelerator 6in
Gigant silver
Gigant black
Tactical Special
M4A1 CQB-R 
M4A1 CARBINE

External links
 Western Arms Home Page Manufacturer's Website (English)

Airsoft